Children of the Dust is an American Western television miniseries, based on Clancy Carlile's 1995 novel of the same name. Featuring an ensemble cast led by Sidney Poitier, Children of the Dust was originally broadcast by CBS on February 26 and 28, 1995.

Plot summary
In the Oklahoma Territory of the late 1880s, Gypsy Smith (Poitier) is a bounty hunter of African American and Cherokee descent.  Smith helps African American homesteaders to settle the territory under the specter of Jim Crow.  Meanwhile, a young Native American raised by Whites (Wirth) must choose between the woman that he loves (Going) or his Cheyenne heritage.

Cast
 Sidney Poitier as Gypsy Smith
 Michael Moriarty as John Maxwell
 Joanna Going as Rachel Maxwell
 Hart Bochner as Shelby Hornbeck
 Regina Taylor as Drusilla
 Billy Wirth as Corby White / White Wolf
 Shirley Knight as Aunt Bertha
 Grace Zabriskie as Rose
 James Caviezel as Dexter
 Robert Guillaume as Jolson Mossburger
 Farrah Fawcett as Nora Maxwell
 John Pyper-Ferguson as Sonny Boy
 Katharine Isabelle as Young Rachel (as Katherine Isobel)
 Byron Chief-Moon as Chief Walks-The-Clouds
 Jesse Lipscombe as Clarence

DVD
On September 20, 1999, the miniseries was released on DVD, under the title A Good Day to Die.  However, it was pared down to 120 minutes, and significant portions of the production were omitted.

References

External links
 

1995 films
1990s English-language films
1995 television films
1995 Western (genre) films
1990s American television miniseries
Cherokee in popular culture
Films scored by Mark Snow
Films about interracial romance
Films about Native Americans
Films about race and ethnicity
Films based on American novels
Films directed by David Greene
Films set in the 1880s
Films set in Oklahoma
Television shows based on American novels
1990s Western (genre) television series
CBS network films
1995 drama films